An abscess of the thymus (also known as "Dubois' abscesses") is a condition that is one of many possible causes of cysts in the mediastinum.

It can present with chest pain behind the sternum.

It can be associated with congenital syphilis.

Although the thymus is usually classified with the immune system, thymic diseases are classified with endocrine disorders in ICD-9 and ICD-10.

References

External links 

Lymphatic organ diseases